Ancasta was a Celtic goddess worshipped in Roman Britain. She is known from a single dedicatory inscription found in the United Kingdom at the Roman settlement of Clausentum (Bitterne, near Southampton). Ancasta may be taken to be a local goddess, possibly associated with the nearby River Itchen.

The votive dedication to Ancasta reads:
DEAE ANCASTAE GEMINVS MANI VSLM
"To the goddess Ancasta, Geminus Mani[lius] willingly and deservedly fulfills his vow."

It may be possible that the name 'Ancasta' is related to Proto-Celtic *kasto- meaning 'swift'.

The inscription is now in the SeaCity Museum. It was previous in the museum at God's House Tower.

References

Goddesses of the ancient Britons
Sea and river goddesses
History of Southampton